Alexandru I may refer to:

 Alexander the Good (Voivode of Moldavia between 1400 and 1432)
 Alexandru I Aldea (1397–1436)